Tryszczyn  is a village in the administrative district of Gmina Koronowo, within Bydgoszcz County, Kuyavian-Pomeranian Voivodeship, in north-central Poland. It is located in the historic region of Kuyavia.

History
During the German occupation (World War II), in 1939, Tryszczyn was the site of large massacres of Poles from Bydgoszcz carried out by the Germans as part of the Intelligenzaktion. Among the victims were teachers, activists, priests, old people, and even boy and girl scouts, gymnasium students, and children as young as 12.

References

Villages in Bydgoszcz County
Nazi war crimes in Poland